Vavien is a 2009 Turkish comedy film directed by the Taylan Brothers.

Cast and characters
 Engin Günaydın as Celal
 Binnur Kaya as Sevilay
 Settar Tanrıöğen as Cemal
 Serra Yılmaz as Vekil
 Binnaz Ekren as Hanife
 İlker Aksum as Sabri
 Şinasi Yurtsever as Seyfi

References

External links 

2009 comedy films
2009 films
Turkish comedy films
2000s Turkish-language films